The Fujifilm X20 is a digital compact camera announced by Fujifilm on January 7, 2013. It is the successor to the Fujifilm X10, with which it shares its lens. However, instead of an EXR colour filter pattern as in the X10, the X20 uses an X-Trans pattern on its sensor. Another advance is that the new sensor supports phase detection autofocus. Concurrently, the image processor was upgraded to version II. The viewfinder no longer is a simple tunnel viewfinder, but includes an information overlay with focus confirmation and exposure data indicated. Another new focusing feature not available in the X10 is focus peaking on the rear display.

The X20 can record video at 1080p (FullHD) resolution at 60 frames per second, twice the framerate of its predecessor. A hybrid autofocus system refocuses automatically during video capture.

The X20 comes in two colour versions, the original black of the X10, and a new black and silver body.

According to Fujifilm, the X20 has "the world's fastest autofocus speed in its class", focusing in as little as 0.06 seconds. It was superseded by the Fujifilm X30 in August 2014.

References

X20
Live-preview digital cameras
Cameras introduced in 2013